Dam Aftab (also Romanized as Dam Āftāb; also known as Dam Āftāb-e Manganān) is a village in Haparu Rural District, in the Central District of Bagh-e Malek County, Khuzestan Province, Iran. At the 2006 census, its population was 238, in 41 families.

References 

Populated places in Bagh-e Malek County